Alpha Rwirangira (born 25 May 1986) is a Rwandan singer/song writer. He sings world music, reggae, soul R&B, and dance music all in English, Swahili and Kinyarwanda.

Music
It was after Rwirangira won the East Africa Tusker Project Fame that his professional music career began. This lead him to record and collaborate with Tanzanian A.Y. on a song called Songa Mbele, and Bebe Cool, on Come To Me song.

After the release of the song, rumors began to circulate that Rwirangira "is not a true Rwandan", because he's cousin to A.Y. After winning Tusker Project Fame, Alpha started touring all over East Africa.
  
In 2010, Rwirangira finalized and released his debut album called One Africa an album that promoted unity and reconciliation among Africans, he then launched it in Rwanda, Kenya, Uganda, Tanzania, and Burundi.

In 2012 Rwirangira moved to the United States to attend Campbellsville University, in Kentucky to pursue his music studies.

In 2012 during his Christmas vacation in Rwanda, Rwirangira recorded two singles, one with King James "Connected", "Beautiful" with Peace and "African Swagga featuring Rah P. In 2013 he worked with La'Myia Good on a song called "Heaven".

One Africa album
 Songa Mbele Ft. A.Y. From (Tanzania)
 Come To Me Ft. Bebe Cool (Uganda)
 One Africa
 Mama
 Love Ft. Junior (Rwanda)
 This Child
 Mwami
 Happy Day Ft. Spax (Rwanda)
 Only you
 Ndagukunda “I Love You” Ft. Princes Priscilla (Rwanda)

2- WOW album 

• wow 

• Son of a king 

.• Hashindwi 

• Hakuna ft Goodluck Gosbert ( Tanzania ) 

• Victoria ft Princess Irebe 

• Iradukunda 

• Amina ft Keilla ( Burundi ) 

• Zura 

• Ishimwe 

• Ndaje 

• Ni wewe 

• Siku yangu

Awards

Won
 2010 Pearl of Africa Music Awards – Best Male Rwanda Artist Year 
 2011 Pearl of Africa Music Awards – Best Rwanda Male Artist
 2011 AMAMU Awards (Afrotainment Museke Africa Music Awards) – Best East African Song of the year for Songa Mbele (Let's move forward).

Nominations
 2011 Tanzania Music Awards – Best East African Song for Songa Mbele featuring A.Y.,

Controversy
Alpha Rwirangira won the 2011 Pearl of Africa Music Awards as Rwanda Best Male Artist, but he refused to attend the award ceremony, because he felt it was poorly organized.

Alpha Rwirangira refused to sign with South African Record Label Gallo Record Company as part of Tusker Project Fame Season 3 winnings. He also accused Tusker Project Fame of not helping past winners and they were in this for making money.

From 2015, Alpha Rwirangira reported to broke up with his longtime girlfriend Esther UWINGABIRE who were among Miss Rwanda 2012 contestants and his promoters Ernesto Ugeziwe and Tijara KABENDERA but both sides didn't confirm the news.

References

External links
Official website

Rwandan male singers
1986 births
Living people